NGC 159 is a barred lenticular galaxy in the constellation Phoenix. The galaxy was discovered on October 28, 1834, by John Frederick William Herschel.

Notes

References

External links 
 
 SEDS

Astronomical objects discovered in 1834
ESO objects
Phoenix (constellation)
02073
0159
Barred lenticular galaxies